Laura Carmichael (born 16 July 1986) is an English film and television actress, most widely known for her performance as Lady Edith Crawley in the ITV (UK) and PBS (US) television period drama series Downton Abbey. Her other work includes television series Marcella (2016), and the feature film A United Kingdom (2016).

Early life
Carmichael was born in Southampton, England. She is the middle of three daughters. Her sister Amy works for a software start-up company and her other sister Olivia is a charity fundraiser with the NHS.

She was educated at Shirley Junior School, The Mountbatten School, and Peter Symonds College. Carmichael attended the Bristol Old Vic Theatre School in Bristol, graduating in 2007, before spending two years in various odd jobs, including a teaching assistant, receptionist, and nanny while going to tiny auditions in fringe theatres.

Career

Film and television
Between 2010 and 2015, she played Lady Edith Crawley in Downton Abbey, a role which brought her worldwide recognition. Commenting on gaining the role of Lady Edith, Carmichael says, "I don't know how it happened with Downton; it really was a miracle. I think it was because I had a good drama school on my CV and they had struggled to find someone for Edith, because she had to be quite different from the two other girls Lady Mary and Lady Sybil". Yet, the actress has enjoyed the role, "When I was at drama school I had quite a lot of wet, ingénue parts, so I'm delighted because it is much more fun playing her. It's interesting how one role can make people see you differently".

Other television roles include parts in The Heart of Thomas Hardy, and End of Our Street. In 2011, she appeared in Tinker Tailor Soldier Spy, and she played Henriette in the 2014 film of Madame Bovary.

Carmichael starred in the 2015 British black comedy feature film Burn, Burn, Burn, a coming-of-age tale, inspired by the Jack Kerouac novel On the Road published in 1957. The directorial debut of Chanya Button, it follows the fictional story of two girls, Seph (Carmichael) and Alex (Chloe Pirrie), taking a road trip to follow the instructions of their close friend Dan, who has died and given them instructions where to scatter his ashes. The ashes (stored in tupperware in the glove compartment) keep diminishing in quantity as the trip progresses. The film had its World premiere at BFI London Film Festival 2015.

In 2016, Carmichael starred in ITV's new television crime drama series, Marcella, as Maddy Stevenson. Marcella focuses on a British Metropolitan police detective and single mother's return to the murder squad, the first English show by Swedish screenwriter Hans Rosenfeldt, who created the Scandinavian television series The Bridge.

In 2016, Carmichael portrayed Muriel Williams in A United Kingdom, a political yet romantic drama, also starring Rosamund Pike and David Oyelowo. The film saw Carmichael immersing herself in the early days of 1940s apartheid. She played Muriel, the sister of Ruth Williams, the Englishwoman who (in real life) challenged colonial racism to marry Seretse Khama, who would become King of Bechuanaland (now Botswana) in 1948.

Theatre
Carmichael made her West End debut in Uncle Vanya opposite Anna Friel and Samuel West in October 2012. She played Arabella in The Fitzrovia Radio Hour at The Underglobe Theatre in early 2013.

In 2016, Carmichael played Madam in Jamie Lloyd's production of The Maids at the Trafalgar Studios in London's West End, co-starring Uzo Aduba.

Carmichael's previous substantial role was in 2011, in David Hare's Plenty at the Sheffield Crucible Theatre with co-stars Anna Friel as Yelena and Ken Stott as Vanya.

She played Laura in Reasons for Living as part of the 2009 Scratch Festival at Battersea Arts Centre. In late 2009, she played Miranda in a touring production of Shakespeare's The Tempest.

Personal life
Carmichael lives in Camden, London.

Carmichael has been in a relationship with her Downton Abbey co-star Michael C. Fox since 2014, making it official in 2016. They have a son who was born in 2021.

Filmography

Theatre

References

External links

January, 2016, NYTimes interview

1986 births
Living people
21st-century English actresses
Actresses from Southampton
Alumni of Bristol Old Vic Theatre School
English radio actresses
English film actresses
English stage actresses
English television actresses
People educated at Peter Symonds College